Juan Manuel Ortiz Prieto (born 14 April 1982 in Uruguay) is a Uruguayan footballer.

Career

In 2003, Ortiz travelled with Club Nacional de Football, one of the most successful Uruguayan teams, to the Peace Cup in South Korea. Despite this, he was not allowed to sign with the club so joined Argentinean side Estudiantes de La Plata instead.

For 2007, he signed for Peñarol, the most successful team in Uruguay but only stayed for half a season.

After playing for Argentinean outfit Club Atlético Huracán, Ortiz enjoyed a four-season stint with C.A. Fénix. He then spent five seasons with Miramar Misiones in the Uruguayan second division before leaving after relegation to the third division at the end of 2018.

References

External links
 

Uruguayan footballers
Living people
Association football forwards
1982 births
Estudiantes de La Plata footballers
Club Atlético Huracán footballers
Miramar Misiones players
Club Sportivo Cerrito players